The Sidney T. Smith House was a farmhouse located at 12880 Michigan Avenue in Grass Lake, Michigan. It was listed on the National Register of Historic Places in 1972. However, the house was destroyed by fire in 1972, and removed in 1978 after its demolition.

History
Sidney T. Smith was born in Chenango County, New York in 1809. He opened a store in Pulaski, New York, and married Harriet B. Wood. In 1839 Smith moved from Pulaski to this location in Grass Lake and opened a store in town. The Smiths constructed a log cabin in which to live. Smith soon designed and built this house. In the 1850s, Smith served as a state legislator.  Smith died in 1878, and was survived by his wife. Sidney passed the house on to his youngest son Charles (born 1859), who was living there into the 1930s. The house was destroyed by fire in 1972.

Description
The Sidney T. Smith House was a two-story tetrastyle Doric "temple front" Greek Revival structure, with single story wings on each side of the main massing. The house very much resembles the design shown in the 1833 pattern book, "Modern Builder's Guide," by Minard Lafever.

References

National Register of Historic Places in Jackson County, Michigan
Greek Revival architecture in Michigan
Houses completed in 1840
Former National Register of Historic Places in Michigan